Abe Greenhalgh (14 April 1920 – 1982) was a British weightlifter. He competed in the men's bantamweight event at the 1948 Summer Olympics.

References

1920 births
1982 deaths
British male weightlifters
Olympic weightlifters of Great Britain
Weightlifters at the 1948 Summer Olympics
Sportspeople from Bolton